The painted parakeet (Pyrrhura picta), known as the painted conure in aviculture, is a species of bird in subfamily Arinae of the family Psittacidae, the African and New World parrots. It is found in Brazil, Colombia, French Guiana, Guyana, Panama, Suriname, and Venezuela.

Taxonomy and systematics

The painted parakeet's taxonomy is unsettled. The International Ornithological Committee (IOC) assigns it these four subspecies:

 P. p. picta (nominate), (Müller, 1776)
 P. p. caeruleiceps ("Todd's" or "Perijá" parakeet), (Todd, 1947)
 P. p. subandina ("Sinu" parakeet), (Todd, 1917)
 P. p. eisenmanni ("Azuero" parakeet), (Delgado, 1985)

The South American Classification Committee of the American Ornithological Society and the Clements taxonomy add a fifth subspecies, emma, that the IOC considers to be a separate species, the Venezuelan parakeet. BirdLife International's Handbook of the Birds of the World considers all five of them to be individual species.

In addition, what are now the Santarem parakeet (P. amazonum), Bonaparte's parakeet (P. lucianii) and rose-fronted parakeet (P. roseifrons) were also lumped as subspecies of the painted parakeet. They were separated as a result of studies published in 2002 and 2006. A second 2002 study suggested treating each subspecies as species, which HBW implemented. The 2006 study cast doubt on the validity of this treatment. 

The Handbook (HBW) goes even further by assigning two subspecies to the Venezuelan parakeet (emma and auricularis) and two to the "Perija" parakeet (caeruleiceps and pantchenkoi). The other systems do not recognize auricularis and pantchenkoi at any level.

This article follows the IOC four-subspecies model.

Description

The sexes are the same in all subspecies. Adults of the nominate subspecies are blue from their forehead to their hindcrown that becomes deep maroon on the hindcrown and nape. They have a narrow blue collar below the nape. Their face is maroon with a ring of bare grayish skin around the eye, and their ear coverts are whitish. Their upperparts are mostly green with a dull red lower back and rump. The sides of their neck and their breast are buff with a reddish brown scalloped appearance. The center of their belly is dull red and the rest of their underparts are green. Their wing is mostly green with a red carpal area and blue primaries. Their tail is mostly maroon with a green base. Their iris is dark. Immatures are similar to adults but without the red carpal and with a whitish eye ring.

Subspecies P. p. caeruleiceps resembles the nominate but with a blue forecrown that becomes brown with a blue tinge on the hindcrown, a pale iris, pale gray-brown ear coverts, a dark red belly patch, and a maroon-red tail. P. p. subandina differs from the nominate with a dull blue and red forehead, a bright maroon-red face, a buff and gray scalloped breast, a green carpal area (sometimes with a few red feathers), and a deep red tail. P. p. eisenmanni has a sooty crown with no blue and little red, somewhat less red on its face than the nominate, a pale ochre iris, and a sooty eye ring.

Distribution and habitat

The subspecies of the painted parakeet are found thus:

 P. p. picta (nominate), southern and eastern Venezuela south of the Orinoco River, the Guianas, and Brazil north of the Amazon River between the Branco River and the Atlantic Ocean in Amapá (Note that the range map is of this subspecies.)
 P. p. caeruleiceps ("Todd's" or "Perijá" parakeet), the western slope of Colombia's Cordillera Oriental and Serranía del Perijá that straddles the Colombia-Venezuela border
 P. p. subandina ("Sinu" parakeet), the Sinú Valley in Colombia's Córdoba Department
 P. p. eisenmanni ("Azuero" parakeet), Panama's Azuero Peninsula

The subspecies' habitats vary. The nominate inhabits terra firme and 
várzea forests, forested savanna, and coastal sand-ridge forest. Subspecies P. p. caeruleiceps appears to be dependent on primary forest but also occurs in landscapes that are a mosaic of forest and agriculture. P. p. subandina inhabits the interior and edges of humid forest from near sea level to at least  and possibly higher. P. p. eisenmanni inhabits hilly humid forest, usually from its mid-level to the canopy but also at the edges, and occasionally in partly cleared areas.

Behavior

Movement

No movement pattern is known for the painted parakeet, but eisenmanni may make some small elevational changes.

Feeding

The painted parakeet feeds on fruits, seeds, and flowers of a very wide variety of plants and trees. It typically forages in flocks of up to about 30 individuals.

Breeding

The painted parakeet's breeding biology is almost unknown. The nominate subspecies breeds between December and February in the Guianas; its season has not been defined elsewhere. It nests in tree cavities, and its clutch size in captivity is four or five eggs. Subspecies P. p. caeruleiceps apparently breeds between March and September but this span possibly has two peak periods. P. p. eisenmanni apparently breeds between January and March and P. p. subandina between March and June.

Vocalization

The vocalizations of the painted parakeet vary somewhat by subspecies. The nominate's most common call is "a series of rather high-pitched, somewhat yelping notes, e.g. “kyeek kyeek kyeek” " that is given both from a perch and in flight. Perched birds also give "a more rolling “kurrek” and a subdued “kek”." However, perched birds are often silent. Flocks in flight "call frequently and simultaneously, producing a noisy, harsh and piercing chattering." Subspecies P. p. caeruleiceps makes a "series of “kurr, kurr, kurr, kurr” or “kirr, kirr, kirr, kirr” notes" when perched. The calls of P. p. eisenmanni are similar to those of the nominate but it adds "a harsh, guttural “kleek-kleek” when perched". The vocalizations of P. p. subandina have not been put into words.

Status

The IUCN follows HBW taxonomy and so has separately assessed the four subspecies of painted parakeet. The nominate subspecies is considered to be of Least Concern. It has a rather large range but its population size is not known and is believed to be decreasing. No immediate threats have been identified. The "Perija" parakeet (P. p. caeruleiceps) is Endangered. It has a limited range and its estimated population of between 1000 and 2500 mature individuals is believed to be decreasing. About 70% of its original habitat has been cleared for cattle ranching and agriculture and what remains is highly fragmented. Capture for the pet trade is also believed to be a significant threat. The "Sinu" parakeet (P. p. subandina) is Critically Endangered (Possibly Extinct). There have been no documented sightings since 1949. It has a very small range and almost all of its suitable habitat has been cleared. It is thought that no more than 50 mature individuals remain if indeed it has not gone extinct. The "Azuero" parakeet (P. p. eisenmanni) was originally assessed as endangered and since 2021 as Vulnerable. It has a restricted range and its estimated population of fewer than 6000 mature individuals is believed to be decreasing. "The species is threatened by habitat loss for conversion to agricultural areas." It does occur in the largely intact Cerro Hoya National Park.

References

External links
 Photo of P. p. picta.. Pascal Dubois.
 Photo of P. p. eisenmanni. Jose García.

painted parakeet
Birds of Panama
Birds of Colombia
Birds of Venezuela
Birds of the Guianas
painted parakeet
Taxonomy articles created by Polbot